The  is a Jōmon archaeological site in Kirishima, Kagoshima Prefecture, Japan. Pit dwellings were discovered during construction work in 1997. The numerous associated earthenware and lithic finds are an Important Cultural Property and the area has been designated a Historic Site. In 2002/3 an area of 36 ha was turned into a park and exhibition centre, known as  lit. 'Uenohara Jōmon Forest'.

See also
 Sannai-Maruyama Site
 Yoshinogari site

References

External links
  Homepage

Archaeological sites in Japan
Historic Sites of Japan
Jōmon period
Parks and gardens in Kagoshima Prefecture
Museums in Kagoshima Prefecture
Tourist attractions in Kagoshima Prefecture
Archaeological museums in Japan